John Crompton may refer to:

John Crompton (MP), English politician
John Battersby Crompton Lamburn (1893–1972), British author writing popular science as John Crompton
Jack Crompton (John Crompton), English footballer

See also
John Crompton Weems (1778 – 1862), American politician
Jonathan Crompton, American football quarterback